Spread Spectrum Time Domain Vernier Method or SSTDV, is a time domain reflectometry method that uses a spread spectrum time domain reflectometry signal to locate intermittent faults in wires (such as aircraft wires) by measuring time delay between incident and reflected signals.  SSTDR uses a pseudo noise (PN) code as the test signal.  This code travels down the length of the wire, where it is reflected off of impedance discontinuities such as open or short circuits.  The reflected signal is correlated with the incident signal to identify the locations of these discontinuities.  In the case of SSTDV, the correlation is accomplished by adding one bit to the PN code each cycle, thus creating a vernier sequence that can be used to resolve the time delay between incident and reflected signals.

References

See also 
 Time-domain reflectometry
 Spread-spectrum time-domain reflectometry

Electronic engineering